The 2016 Uttarakhand Super League season (known as the 2016 JSW Uttarakhand Super League for sponsorship reasons) was the first season of the Uttarakhand Super League football competition since its foundation earlier in the year. The season featured fourteen teams and kicked off on 10 July 2016.

Pauri Platoons emerged as the first champions after defeating Nainital FC Lakes in the final on 9 August.

The 25,000-capacity BHEL Stadium in Ranipur is the largest venue by capacity used for Uttarakhand Super League matches.

Teams

First round

Group A

Group B

Second round

Group A

Group B

Finals

Semi-finals

Third-place match

Final

End-of-season awards

See also
Uttarakhand State Football Association

References

External links
 

 
1